The house at 145–153 S Main St, Tucson, Arizona, officially listed in the National Register of Historic Places as the Sosa–Carrillo–Fremont House, is known locally for its association with John Charles Frémont, former Territorial Governor of Arizona.

The house was originally listed on the National Register as the John Charles Fremont, Casa del Gobernador, House in 1971, but the official listing name was later changed to Sosa–Carrillo–Fremont House to better reflect the building's association with several important families in the region's history.

The building is also known as the Carrillo House, the Leopoldo Carrillo House, and the Carrillo–Frémont House. The building is now owned by the Arizona Historical Society and is operated as a museum.

See also

 Leopoldo Carrillo

References

External links
 Arizona Historical Society: Tucson Museums

Adobe buildings and structures
Museums in Tucson, Arizona
Historic house museums in Arizona
Houses in Pima County, Arizona
Houses on the National Register of Historic Places in Arizona
National Register of Historic Places in Tucson, Arizona
Houses completed in 1858
1858 establishments in New Mexico Territory